The Paris Legends Championship is a men's senior (over 50) professional golf tournament on the European Senior Tour. It was held for the first time in September 2016 at Le Golf National, Paris, France. The winner was Magnus Persson Atlevi who won the first prize of €52,500 out of total prize-money of €350,000. Paul Broadhurst won the 2017 event, two strokes ahead of John Daly. In 2018 the event moved to Racing Club de France La Boulie and was won by Gary Orr, with total prize money of €300,000.

Winners

In 2019 Shacklady won after making a par 5 at the first extra hole.

External links
Coverage on the European Senior Tour's official site

European Senior Tour events
Golf tournaments in France
Recurring sporting events established in 2016
2016 establishments in France